Selig may refer to:

Selig (name)
Selig (band), a Hamburg-based German grunge band
Selig, Ohio, a community in the United States
Selig Polyscope Company, an American motion picture company founded by William Selig
Selig's Wild Animal Farm (~1912–1914) in Santa Monica and its successor, Selig Zoo (1915-~1935), in Los Angeles, California

See also
Zelig (disambiguation)